Stephen Furness may refer to:
 Sir Stephen Furness, 1st Baronet (1872–1914), ship-owner and Member of Parliament for The Hartlepools 1910–1914
 Stephen Furness (Sunderland MP) (1902–1974), Member of Parliament for Sunderland 1935–1945
Steve Furness (1950–2000), American footballer